New York's 10th congressional district is a congressional district for the United States House of Representatives currently represented by Democrat Dan Goldman. The district contains all of Lower Manhattan and the Brooklyn Heights, DUMBO, Cobble Hill, Red Hook, Gowanus, Prospect Heights, South Slope, Park Slope, and Sunset Park neighborhoods in western Brooklyn. The district also contains portions of Borough Park and Bay Ridge in Brooklyn. Prior to the 2020 census, the district stretched from the Upper West Side of Manhattan to Borough Park.

Redistricting history
This congressional district has changed configurations and locations many times throughout its history due to redistricting, initially starting out as an upstate constituency before gradually moving south. Beginning in the 1870s, it shifted into parts of New York City, where it has remained to this day.

In the 20th century, the 10th district was always a Brooklyn-based seat from 1913 until 1973, when that iteration of the district was redrawn and renumbered as the new , and the 10th was reassigned to a district in northern Queens and the east Bronx. The 1980 redistricting cycle restored the 10th district to Brooklyn, covering largely the same terrain as before. In the 1990 remap, much of the old 10th district was added to the new Queens–Brooklyn , while the new 10th then absorbed much of the old , including its congressman, Ed Towns.

From 2003 to 2013, this district was exclusively Brooklyn-based. During this time, it was majority-African American and included the neighborhoods of Bedford-Stuyvesant, Brooklyn Heights, Brownsville, Canarsie, East New York, and Ocean Hill, as well as parts of Fort Greene, Prospect Heights, and Williamsburg.

Demographically, it also had the largest number (270,000) and the highest percentage of Jews (37.6%) of any congressional district, largely as a result of the fact that it included several heavily Jewish neighborhoods of Manhattan and Brooklyn, which it still does in its new configuration.

List of members representing the district

National and statewide election results

Electoral history

District election results

The following are historical results for the 10th district's congressional elections.

See also

List of United States congressional districts
New York's congressional districts
United States congressional delegations from New York

Notes

References

 Congressional Biographical Directory of the United States 1774–present
 2006 House election data Clerk of the House of Representatives
 2004 House election data
 2002 House election data
 2000 House election data
 1998 House election data
 1996 House election data

10
Politics of Brooklyn
Constituencies established in 1793
1793 establishments in New York (state)